Haplotmarus is a monotypic genus of Asian crab spiders containing the single species, Haplotmarus plumatilis. It was first described by Eugène Louis Simon in 1909, and is found in Vietnam.

See also
 List of Thomisidae species

References

Further reading

Monotypic Araneomorphae genera
Spiders of Asia
Thomisidae